Joel Solomon Goldsmith (March 10, 1892 – June 17, 1964) was an American spiritual author, teacher, spiritual healer, and modern-day mystic. He founded The Infinite Way movement.

Early years and career 

Joel S. Goldsmith was born in New York City on March 10, 1892. His parents were non-practicing Jews, who were married in New York City in 1891. Joel was their first child. They had another son two years later, followed by a daughter two years thereafter.

In 1915, Joel's father became critically ill while in England and word was sent to the Goldsmith family to come for the body. However, according to Joel, his father was healed by a Christian Science practitioner in London. From his early adulthood, Joel Goldsmith had many spiritual experiences.

He was a healer who spent many years in spiritual studies, reading original scriptures of Aramaic, Greek and Sanskrit origins. His first book, The Infinite Way, was published in 1948.

After serving in the Marines during World War I, Goldsmith returned to work in the garment district of New York City, where he owned his own business. While on a return trip from Europe, he developed pneumonia. As was his father before him, Goldsmith was healed by a Christian Science practitioner who happened to be on board his ship at the time.

In 1928, strangers began approaching Goldsmith on the street, asking for prayer and healing. He had no religious training whatsoever, but these people allegedly were healed. To seek answers about this phenomenon, Goldsmith first entered the Christian Science Church and worked at Rikers Island prison as a First Reader. After 16 years, he left the Church and moved to Boston, where he set up his own office. He moved to California before World War II and maintained a successful healing practice there.

In 1948 Goldsmith wrote the book The Infinite Way, which came to the attention of Willing Publishers. The book's title also became the name associated with his spiritual message and work.

The Infinite Way 

Goldsmith self-published his most famous work, The Infinite Way, in 1947, which was based on letters to patients and students. He also published The Spiritual Interpretation of Scripture.

The writings which followed were transcriptions of his lectures which had been recorded on the first wire recorders in the late 1940s. These were distributed by Goldsmith Publishing. They were: The Master Speaks, The First, Second, Third San Francisco Lecture Series, Consciousness Unfolding, God the Substance of All Form, and Metaphysical Notes. These original books were later republished during Goldsmith's lifetime by publishers in various countries, making over fifty books.

As Goldsmith was approached by large publishing houses around the world to produce books of his talks, he enlisted the help of Lorraine Sinkler and her sister Valborg to edit his books, which were generally compiled from various lecture transcripts.

Goldsmith's insistence on "no organization" insured that his message remained a personal journey with leaders naturally evolving from new generations. There is no service, ritual, dogma, or ceremony in the practice of the Infinite Way. Goldsmith students can be found in all walks of life, in all religions. His message is one that can be read and heard for a lifetime, always allowing new understandings to unfold in each individual.

Goldsmith stressed "contemplative meditation" practice in his teaching. The method he generally taught involved short frequent meditation periods throughout the day. He told his student of 18 years, Walter Starcke, that the main reason to meditate was that through reaching the inner silence one could hear the still small voice and receive its intuitive guidance. His teaching also stressed spiritual healing through conscious contact with God.

After writing the work, Goldsmith expected to retire to a life of contemplation. However, the work prompted people to seek him out as a spiritual teacher, leading to the extension of his career, teaching and writing.

Death 

Joel Solomon Goldsmith died on June 17, 1964, at the Piccadilly Hotel, Westminster, London, UK. His body was cremated at Golders Green in London on June 18, 1964, and his ashes and effects were released to his widow, Emma Goldsmith, who took them back to their home in Hawaii. Both were interred in Sun City, Arizona.

Bibliography 

 Beyond Words and Thoughts
 Collected Essays of Joel S. Goldsmith
 Conscious Union With God
 Consciousness in Transition
 Consciousness is What I AM
 Consciousness Transformed
 Contemplative Life
 Gift of Love
 God, The Substance of All Form (1949 edition)
 Invisible Supply
 Leave your Nets (original)
 Living Between Two Worlds
 Living Now
 Living the Infinite Way
 Man Was Not Born to Cry
 Metaphysical Healing
 Our Spiritual Resources
 Parenthesis in Eternity
 Practicing the Presence
 Realization of Oneness
 The 1954 Letters
 The 1955 Letters
 The 1956 Letters
 The 1957 Letters
The 1958 Letters
 The 1959 Letters
 The Art of Meditation
 The Art of Spiritual Healing
 The Infinite Way (1948)
 The Master Speaks (original)
 The Mystical "I"
 The Spiritual Interpretation of Scripture
 The Thunder of Silence
 The World is New

See also 
The Infinite Way

References

External links 

 , maintained by Sue Ropac, grand-daughter of Goldsmith's wife.
Guide to the Joel S. Goldsmith Papers 1949-1964 at the University of Chicago Special Collections Research Center

1892 births
1964 deaths
20th-century mystics
Jewish American military personnel
American spiritual writers
American spiritual teachers
Christian Science writers
New Thought mystics
New Thought writers